The 2012–13 East of Scotland Football League was the 84th season of the East of Scotland Football League. Stirling University were the defending champions.

The league was split into two separate divisions, the Premier Division and the First Division. This season saw 26 teams competing across the two divisions, which was the largest number in the league's history prior to the influx of Junior clubs in 2018–19.

Premier Division

Whitehill Welfare claimed their 16th league title. Post-season league reconstruction after the departure of nine clubs to the newly formed Lowland Football League meant there was no relegation from the Premier Division.

Teams

The following teams have changed division since the 2011–12 season.

To Premier Division
Promoted from First Division
 Heriot-Watt University
 Preston Athletic

From Premier Division
Relegated to First Division
 Leith Athletic
 Selkirk

Stadia and locations

League table

First Division

The First Division saw an increase in the number of clubs to fourteen with the addition of Burntisland Shipyard to the league. Craigroyston claimed the First Division title for the second time. Post-season league construction meant a third club gained promotion to the Premier Division.

Teams

The following teams have changed division since the 2011–12 season.

To First Division
Relegated from Premier Division
 Selkirk
 Leith Athletic

Transferred from Kingdom Caledonian AFA
 Burntisland Shipyard

From First Division
Promoted to Premier Division
 Heriot-Watt University
 Preston Athletic

Stadia and locations

League table

References

5